For main Top 5 Division, see: 2010 Asian Five Nations

The 2010 Asian Five Nations division tournaments, known as the 2010 HSBC Asian 5 Nations due to the tournament's sponsorship by the HSBC, refer to the Asian Five Nations divisions played within the tournament. This was the 3rd series of the Asian Five Nations. 

There were four main divisions, with further regional division. The winners of Division 1 would be promoted up to the Top Division for 2011, as will the winner of Division 2 being promoted to Division 1. The loser of Division 1, drops to Division 2, and the winner of Division 3 replaces the last place team in Division 2.

Scoring system: 5 points for a win, three for a draw, one bonus point for being within seven points of the winning team, and one for four tries.

Changes from 2009
 The Arabian Gulf are no longer competing in Division 1, following promotion to the Top 5 Division.
 Malaysia have replaced Thailand in Division 1, with Thailand competing in Division 2.
 Philippines will compete in Division 2 - replacing Pakistan, following promotion from Division 3.
 A newly Division 4 is added, with only one Regional Division taking place.

Teams
The teams involved, with their world rankings pre tournament, were:

Division 1
  (52)
  (68)
  (51)
  (54)

Division 2
  (52)
  (84)
  (71)
  (NA)

Division 3
  (82)
  (NA)
  (NA)
  (NA)

Division 4
  Almaty Select XV (NA)
  (NA)
  (NA)
  (NA)

Regional Division
  (NA)
  (NA)
  (NA)

Division 1

Division One is the second level of the ARFU. As the winner of Division One, Sri Lanka was promoted to 2011 HSBC Asian 5 Nations and the 4th place team, Chinese Taipei, was relegated to Division Two for 2011.

Fixtures

Semi finals

Third v Fourth Final

Final

Division 2

Division Two is the third level of the ARFU. As the winner of Division Two, the Philippines was promoted to Division One for 2011 and the fourth-placed team, China, was relegated to Division Three for 2011.

Fixtures

Semi finals

Third v Fourth Final

Final

Division 3

Division Three is the fourth level of the ARFU. As the winner of Division Three, Iran was promoted to Division Two for 2011 and the fourth-placed team, Indonesia, was relegated to Division Four for 2011.

Fixtures

Semi finals

Third v Fourth Final

Final

Division 4

Division Four is the fifth level and new Tournament of the ARFU.
The Division IV tournament was originally scheduled to be held in Bishkek, Kyrgyzstan, but recent unrest forced the movement of the division to neighbouring Kazakhstan and the recent closure of the border between Kyrgyzstan and Kazakhstan saw Kyrgyzstan unable to travel for the tournament. Kyrgyzstan were replaced by an assembled Almaty Select XV.  As the winner of Division Four, Jordan was promoted to Division Three for 2011

Fixtures

Semi finals

Third v Fourth Final

Final

Regional

Fixtures

Test Match

 First test match for both teams.
 Lebanon were recently admitted to the ARFU as an associate member (12/2009)

References

Division 1

External links
Official Website
ARFU

2010
2010 in Asian rugby union
Asia